Dauair was a low-cost regional airline based in Lübeck, Germany. It operated domestic and international services. Its main base was Dortmund Airport.

History 
Following the withdrawal of its licence by Germany's Federal Office of Aviation on August 9, 2006 the company invoked an insolvency procedure with the Lübeck district court on August 16, 2006 and stopped flying.

Destinations 
Dauair served the following scheduled destinations:
Austria - Innsbruck, Salzburg, Vienna
Germany - Dortmund, Hanover, Nuremberg, Munich
Poland - Poznan, Warsaw
Switzerland - Zurich, Geneva, Basel
United Kingdom - Fairford

Fleet 

As of August 2006 the dauair fleet included the following aircraft:

3 Saab 340 (taken over from Carpatair)
1 Fairchild Metro III

References

External links

Official website

Defunct European low-cost airlines
Defunct airlines of Germany
Airlines established in 2005
Airlines disestablished in 2006
German companies disestablished in 2006
German companies established in 2005